The Florida Gators cross country program represents the University of Florida in the sport of cross country running.  The program includes separate men's and women's cross country teams, both of which compete in National Collegiate Athletic Association (NCAA) Division I and the Southeastern Conference (SEC).  The men's cross country team officially started in 1935; the women's team began in 1980.

Coaching staff 

Mike Holloway is the head coach for the Florida Gators cross country and track and field program; Chris Solinsky is the assistant coach who is responsible for the day-to-day oversight of the men's and women's cross country teams.

See also 

Florida Gators
Florida Gators track and field
History of the University of Florida
List of University of Florida Athletic Hall of Fame members
List of University of Florida Olympians
University Athletic Association

References

External links